Geodia alba is a species of sponge in the family Geodiidae. The species is found in the waters of Indonesia and was first described by Oswald Kieschnick in 1896 as Synops alba.

References

Tetractinellida
Sponges described in 1896